Earthtones is a 2004 studio album by American hip hop group Crown City Rockers.

Track listing

References

External links
 

2004 albums
Crown City Rockers albums